Johan Lars Daniel Patriksson (born 28 May 1982) is a Swedish footballer playing for IK Oddevold as a forward.

He started his career for IK Svane and have later played professionally for IK Oddevold, BK Häcken, Ljungskile SK and GIF Sundsvall.

References

External links
Eliteprospects profile

 

1982 births
Living people
People from Uddevalla Municipality
Swedish footballers
BK Häcken players
Ljungskile SK players
GIF Sundsvall players
IK Oddevold players
Ettan Fotboll players
Association football forwards
Sportspeople from Västra Götaland County